Emile Detiège (born 1840) was a sherriff and state legislator in Louisiana. He served in the Louisiana Senate from 1874 to 1876. He represented St. Martin Parish.

Eric Foner documented him as a French speaking "quadroon" born to a family of jewelers. He was a 1st Lieutenant and organizer of Company C, 1st Louisiana Native Guard that became known as the 73rd U.S. Colored Infantry. He campaigned for Black suffrage and after an unsuccessful campaign in 1868 served as a customs inspector. He won office to the Louisiana Senate from 1874 to 1876 and Louisiana House from 1877 to 1880.

See also
African-American officeholders during and following the Reconstruction era

References

1840 births
Year of death missing
African-American state legislators in Louisiana

Louisiana state senators
Members of the Louisiana House of Representatives
Louisiana sheriffs
People of Louisiana in the American Civil War
African-American politicians during the Reconstruction Era
People from St. Martin Parish, Louisiana